Connor Bartlett (born 30 May 1997) is a British male acrobatic gymnast. With partners Gareth Wood, Daniel Cook and George Wood, Bartlett achieved silver in the 2014 Acrobatic Gymnastics World Championships.

References

1997 births
Living people
British acrobatic gymnasts
Male acrobatic gymnasts
Medalists at the Acrobatic Gymnastics World Championships
21st-century British people